Badamestan may refer to:
 Badamestan-e Amid Ali, Chaharmahal and Bakhtiari Province
 Badamestan-e Aqajun, Chaharmahal and Bakhtiari Province
 Badamestan-e Mashhadiamir, Chaharmahal and Bakhtiari Province
 Badamestan-e Bala, Kerman Province
 Badamestan-e Pain, Kerman, Kerman Province
 Badamestan, Kohgiluyeh and Boyer-Ahmad
 Badamestan, Zanjan
 Badamestan-e Farvivand, Khuzestan Province